The Stanley Kramer Award, since its inception in 2002 by the Producers Guild of America and named after film director/producer Stanley Kramer, has been given for films that "illuminate provocative social issues".

History
Sean Penn, Jane Fonda and Rita Moreno (each an Academy Award winner) are the only three people to receive this award.

Receipents 
 2001: I Am Sam
 2002: Antwone Fisher
 2003: In America
 2004: Hotel Rwanda (TIE)

Voces inocentes (Innocent Voices) (TIE) 2005: Good Night, and Good Luck
 2006: An Inconvenient Truth
 2007: The Great Debaters
 2008: Milk
 2009: Precious
 2010: Sean Penn (first person to receive a Stanley Kramer Award)
 2011: In the Land of Blood and Honey
 2012: Bully
 2013: Fruitvale Station
 2014: The Normal Heart
 2015: The Hunting Ground
 2016: Loving
 2017: Get Out
 2018: Bombshell
 2019: Jane Fonda
 2020: No award
 2021: Rita Moreno
2022: Till

See also
NBR Freedom of Expression
Social problem film
Message picture

References

External links
 PGA Awards website

Awards established in 2002
Producers Guild of America Awards
Social issues